Oomana Thinkal is a 1983 Indian Malayalam-language film, directed by Yatheendra Das and produced by Kora George. The film stars Kaviyoor Ponnamma, Venu Nagavally, Baby Anju and Babu Namboothiri in the lead roles. The film has musical score by M. B. Sreenivasan.

Cast
Kaviyoor Ponnamma
Venu Nagavally
Baby Anju
Babu Namboothiri
Balan K. Nair
Shanthi Krishna

Soundtrack
The music was composed by M. B. Sreenivasan with lyrics by Bichu Thirumala.

References

External links
 

1983 films
1980s Malayalam-language films